Al-Ittihad is a major professional basketball club. It is a part of the Al-Ittihad Sports Club, which is based in Aleppo, Syria. Al-Ittihad is the second most titled basketball club with 20 Syrian League titles and 21 Syrian Cups one of the most successful basketball clubs in Syria. Al-Ahli was founded in 1951, two years after the founding of the multi-sport club and the football team.

History

The club, which was founded in 1951, is one of the most famous and popular basketball clubs in Syria. The club changed its name in 1972, its previous one, Al Ahli, being used as a club nickname. 

The club's Great Era began in 1978 with the victory of the Syrian Cup and the defeat of Al Jalaa SC in the SBL final of the following 1979 season. In the league finals, Al-Ittihad defeated Al Jalaa in Aleppo twice 90-72 and 59-50, then achieved a third victory in the decisive match that took place in Damascus for exceptional circumstances  66-58. This season is also remarkable that they claimed the Republic Cup by defeating Al Jalaa 76-71. 

Al Ittihad has twice been invited to take part in the FIBA European Champions Cup (EuroLeague). The first participation was in the 1979-80 season, during which the club, led by coach Munther Shalaby, faced in Group E the KK Partizan, BC Partizani Tirana and Budapest Honvéd SE. The club was supposed to take part in the 1981–82 FIBA European Champions Cup as well, but after its beginning they withdrew from the competition.

During the 1980s, Al-Ittihad was the Syrian League's hegemon as they won every domestic competition. The club's first major success on the international stage was third place at the 1991 Arab Basketball Championships. In the following season, the club won both home titles, advanced to the finals of the Arab Championship and defeated  EO La Goulette Kram. The Great Era of domestic domination ended in the 1994 season with a loss in the SBL final with the Al-Wahda.

In the 2000 season, they won their last long title in the Syrian Cup, the penultimate title in the SBL and advanced to the WABA Champions Cup. In the 2001 season, however, they finished third behind Al-Wahda and Orthodox BC. 

In the 2006 season, they won their last domestic SBL title, finishing ahead of Al Jalaa SC, Al-Jaish and Al Wahda in the Final Four. In the 2007 and 2008 seasons, they participated in the WABA Cup, but without significant success.

After the outbreak of the conflict in Syria and the Battle of Aleppo, the club's operations were limited and its survival uncertain. Fortunately, the sports club managed to survive and the first big success under coach Bassel al Hamwi was the Syrian Cup victory in the 2020 season.

In the 2022 season, Al-Ittihad won the Syrian Super Cup when they defeated Al-Wahda 60:52 in the final of the competition.

Home arena
Al-Assad Sports Arena: 1978–2021
Al-Hamadaniah Sports Arena: 2021–present

For many years, Ittihad has used the Al-Assad Sports Arena, with a seating capacity of 3,500, to host its home games. Currently, Ittihad uses the 7,964 seat Al-Hamadaniah Sports Arena for its home games.

Club rivalries
Al-Ittihad SC plays the Aleppo city derby "El Clásico"  with its main rival Al-Jalaa SC.

Other urban rivals of the club are Al-Hurriya SC, Al-Yarmouk SC (Homenetmen) and Ouroube SC.

Honours

Domestic
Syrian Basketball League
Winners (20): 1979 - 1980 - 1981 - 1982 - 1983 - 1984 - 1985 - 1986 - 1987 - 1988 - 1989 - 1990 - 1991 - 1992 - 1993 - 1995 - 1996 - 2000 - 2006 - 2022

Syrian Basketball Cup
Winners (21): 1978 - 1979 - 1980 - 1981 - 1982 - 1983 - 1984 - 1985 - 1986 - 1987 - 1988 - 1990 - 1991 - 1992 - 1993 - 1994 - 1995 - 1997 - 1998 - 2000 - 2020
Syrian Basketball Super Cup
Winners (1): 2021

International
WABA Champions Cup
Third place (1): 2001
Sixth place (2): 2007 - 2008
Arab Club Basketball Championship
Winners (1): 1992
Third place (1): 1991
EuroLeague
Quarter-finals: 1979
Dubai International Tournament
Third place (1): 2005

International record

Sponsorship
As of 2022:

Current roster
Squad for the 2021–2022 Syrian Basketball League season:

Transfers
Transfers for the 2021-22 season:

 Joining
  Antwan Scott from  Al Hilal SC
  Mohamed Harat from  Al Fateh SC
  Wael Jlilaty from  Duba SC
  Ishaq Oubid from  Jalaa SC
  Abdulwahab Al-Hamwi from  Al-Karamah
  Michael Madanly from  Jalaa SC 

 Leaving
  Wissam Yaqqub  to  Jalaa SC  
  Nazem Kassas  to  Wahda SC

Notable players

Fadi El Khatib

Micheal Madanly

Head coaches

Season by season

All-time records
Most Syrian Basketball Cup champions (21 championships)

References

External links
basketball.asia, Al-Ittihad 
Unofficial Fan Site and Forum 
 Men Basketball European Champions Cup 1982

Ittihad
Sport in Aleppo
Basketball teams established in 1951
1951 establishments in Syria